This is a list of monuments that are classified by the Moroccan ministry of culture around Agadir.

Monuments and sites in Agadir 

|}

References 

Agadir
Agadir